Aaron Sheehan (born 1994) is an Irish hurler who plays for London Championship club Kilburn Gaels and at inter-county level with the London senior hurling team. He usually lines out as a right corner-forward.

Career statistics

Honours

Team

Mallow
Cork Premier Intermediate Football Championship (1): 2017

Cork
Munster Intermediate Hurling Championship (1): 2015

Individual

Awards
Christy Ring Cup Champion 15 (1): 2018

References

1994 births
Living people
Mallow hurlers
Mallow Gaelic footballers
Kilburn Gaels hurlers
Cork inter-county hurlers
London inter-county hurlers
Hurling forwards